Nirmala Convent Higher Secondary School is a Roman Catholic school located in Sironj, Madhya Pradesh, India. It offers primary and secondary education. The school was founded in 1973.

References

External links
NCHSS page

Catholic secondary schools in India
Primary schools in India
High schools and secondary schools in Madhya Pradesh
Christian schools in Madhya Pradesh
Vidisha district
Educational institutions established in 1973
1973 establishments in Madhya Pradesh